This list is of the Places of Scenic Beauty of Japan located within the Prefecture of Tokushima.

National Places of Scenic Beauty
As of 1 January 2021, four Places have been designated at a national level.

Prefectural Places of Scenic Beauty
As of 1 January 2021, five Places have been designated at a prefectural level.

Municipal Places of Scenic Beauty
As of 1 May 2020, fifteen Places have been designated at a municipal level.

See also
 Cultural Properties of Japan
 List of Historic Sites of Japan (Tokushima)
 List of parks and gardens of Tokushima Prefecture

References

External links
  Cultural Properties of Tokushima Prefecture

Tourist attractions in Tokushima Prefecture
Places of Scenic Beauty